Thomas Flegler (born 19 August 1999) is an Australian professional rugby league footballer who plays as a  and  for the Brisbane Broncos in the NRL.

He has represented the Prime Minister's XIII. He has also represented Queensland in State of Origin, where he is notable for being undefeated.

Background
Flegler was born in Townsville, Queensland, Australia. He played his junior rugby league for the Tully Tigers, before being signed by the Brisbane Broncos.

Career

2018 
In early 2018, Queensland under-20s coach, Justin Hodges drew comparisons of Flegler to that of former Broncos forward, Shane Webcke and praised him saying one day he could become the centrepiece of the Broncos in the future. “They’re obviously different body shapes but in terms of being physical and the way he runs the ball and the way he tackles, he’s definitely like Shane Webcke. That’s all he did, ran straight and did his job. Tommy’s a little bit more agile on his feet, he can play with the ball and draw defenders."

2019 
He made his debut in round 1 of the 2019 NRL season against the Melbourne Storm. In Round 2, In his second NRL game against the North Queensland Cowboys, Flegler ran for the most running metres, running for 196 metres off 16 runs. On 29 June, he scored his first career try for the Broncos in a 26–12 loss to the Newcastle Knights. On 7 October 2019, Flegler was named at prop for the U23 Junior Australian side. On 21 October, Flegler won the Broncos' Rookie of the Year along with Patrick Carrigan.

In December 18, Flegler re-signed with the Broncos for a one-year-deal, keeping him at the club until the end of 2021. "It all happened pretty quick, so I'm pumped to be here for another year and get back into training and focus on 2020," said Flegler.

2020
Flegler played 13 games for Brisbane in the 2020 NRL season in a year which saw them finish last on the table and claim the wooden spoon.

2021
Flegler made his state of origin debut for Queensland in game 3 of the series due to the suspension of forwards David Fifita and Jai Arrow, where Queensland won 20-18.
In round 19, he was sent to the sin bin for a dangerous high tackle on Penrith's Isaah Yeo in Brisbane's 18-12 loss.
In round 24, Flegler was sent to the sin bin during Brisbane's loss against Cronulla for a dangerous high tackle.
On 31 August, Flegler was suspended by the NRL Judiciary for four matches in relation to the high tackle.

2022
Flegler played a total of 18 games for Brisbane in the 2022 NRL season as the club finished 9th on the table and missed the finals.

Controversy
In September 2021, Flegler was involved in a fight with teammate Jordan Riki after a night out during Brisbane's mad monday celebrations.  It was reported that Riki received a cut on his face over the incident.

References

External links

Broncos profile

1999 births
Living people
Australian rugby league players
Brisbane Broncos players
Rugby league locks
Rugby league props
Rugby league players from Townsville
Queensland Rugby League State of Origin players